Gyro-Kopp-Ters is an American aircraft manufacturer based in Lake City, Florida and founded by brothers Bob and Arden Kopp. The company specializes in the design and manufacture of autogyros in the form of kits for amateur construction.

The company makes a single seat autogyro, the Gyro-Kopp-Ters Midnight Hawk, and a two-seats in tandem model, the Gyro-Kopp-Ters Twin Eagle, both of which use Subaru automotive conversion engines and Dragon Wings main rotors made by Rotor Flight Dynamics.

Aircraft

References

External links

Aircraft manufacturers of the United States
Autogyros
Homebuilt aircraft